Solidarity Party Youth League (in Swedish: SolidaritetsPartiets Ungdomsförbund) was a youth group connected to the Solidarity Party in Vallentuna, Sweden. SPUF existed in 1988.

Youth wings of political parties in Sweden